The Singa Sea was a bulk carrier which sank en route from Bunbury, Western Australia to Rotterdam via Cape Town in 1988, with the loss of 19 crew members.
The disaster was notable for the long survival period of its remaining six crew, who remained adrift in the Indian Ocean for 29 days after the sinking before being rescued by a passing ship.

Notes

Further reading
 O'Brien, Thomas Niel (2003) The loss of the ship Singa Sea, 1988 : a narrative covering the loss of a cargo ship off Bunbury Western Australia Bunbury, W.A. T.N. O'Brien.

History of Western Australia
Maritime incidents in 1988
Shipwrecks in the Indian Ocean